John Allred (born 1962) is an American jazz trombonist. He is the son of another jazz trombonist, Bill Allred.

Career 
After graduating from high school, John Allred moved to southern California and started his professional music career with the Jazz Minors, a six-piece Dixieland group at Disneyland in Anaheim, California. During this time, he became active in the Los Angeles music scene, and in 1987 he accepted an invitation to join Woody Herman and the Young Thundering Herd.

He moved to Orlando, Florida, playing both jazz and studio gigs. He was then asked to play in the Harry Connick Jr. Big Band, with whom he toured and performed on numerous recordings and television appearances. In the movie My Girl, he coached actor Dan Aykroyd on how to mimic a tuba player and recorded the tuba parts for the soundtrack. During this time he also took an active role in his father's jazz band, played in numerous production shows, and played euphonium with Rich Matteson and Harvey Phillips in the Matteson-Phillips Tubajazz Consort.

In 1999, Allred moved to New York City and performed with the Toshiko Akiyoshi Big Band, the Woody Herman Orchestra, and the Carnegie Hall Jazz Band.

Discography
 In the Beginning (Arbors, 1993)
 Focused (AppleJazz, 1998)
 Head to Head (Arbors, 2002)
 The ABC's of Jazz (Arbors, 2009)
 Live and Unplugged (2014)
 
With Warren Vache
 2008 Jubilation
 2009 Top Shelf
 2010 Ballads and Other Cautionary Tales

References

American jazz trombonists
Male trombonists
1962 births
Living people
21st-century trombonists
21st-century American male musicians
American male jazz musicians
Matteson-Phillips Tubajazz Consort members
Arbors Records artists